R2R may refer to:

 Record to report, a finance and accounting management process
 R-2R, a configuration of resistor ladder
 Reel-to-reel, Reel-to-reel audio tape recording
 Right to repair
 Right to Reply, a former British television series
 Roll-to-roll, creating electronic devices on flexible rolls